Vladlen Kostyantinovich Trostyansky (26 January 1935– 28 July 2014) was a bantamweight Greco-Roman wrestler from Ukraine. He competed at the 1964 Olympics and 1966 World Championships and won a silver medal in 1964.

Trostyansky took up wrestling in 1951 and soon became one of the best Soviet wrestlers in his division. Internationally he was a substitute to Oleg Karavayev, and started competing only after Karavayev's retirement in 1964. Domestically he won two Soviet titles, in 1961 and 1966, both times in Karavayev's absence, placing second in 1962–65 and 1968. After retiring from competitions Trostyansky worked as a wrestling coach in Ukraine and headed the Wrestling Federation of Kiev Oblast.

References

1935 births
2014 deaths
Sportspeople from Kyiv
Olympic wrestlers of the Soviet Union
Wrestlers at the 1964 Summer Olympics
Soviet male sport wrestlers
Ukrainian male sport wrestlers
Olympic silver medalists for the Soviet Union
Olympic medalists in wrestling
Medalists at the 1964 Summer Olympics